P95 or p95 may refer to:

 Embraer P-95 Bandeirulha, a maritime patrol aircraft of the Brazilian Air Force
 , a patrol boat of the Royal Australian Navy 
 , a submarine of the Royal Navy
 Papyrus 95, a biblical manuscript
 Ruger P95, a 1996 pistol model
 P95, a NIOSH air filtration rating
 P95, a state regional road in Latvia